The following outline is provided as an overview of and topical guide to accounting:

Accounting – measurement, statement or provision of assurance about financial information primarily used by managers, investors, tax authorities and other decision makers to make resource allocation decisions within companies, organizations, and public agencies. The terms derive from the use of financial accounts.

Nature of accounting

What type of thing is accounting? 
Accounting can be described as all of the following:

 Vocation – occupation to which a person is specially drawn or for which they are suited, trained, or qualified. Though now often used in non-religious contexts, the meanings of the term originated in Christianity. 
 Profession –
 Academic discipline –

Essence of accounting 
 Bookkeeping
 Single-entry bookkeeping system
 Double-entry bookkeeping system
 Financial statements
 Financial audit

Fields of accounting 
 Auditing
 Cost accounting – helps managers understand the costs of running a business.
 Financial accounting –  field of accountancy concerned with the preparation of financial statements for decision makers, such as stockholders, suppliers, banks, employees, government agencies, owners, and other *stakeholders.
 Forensic accounting –  specialty practice area of accountancy that describes engagements that result from actual or anticipated disputes or litigation.
 Fund accounting –  accounting system emphasizing accountability rather than profitability, used by non-profit organizations and governments.
 Governmental accounting
 Management accounting – concerned with the provisions and use of accounting information to managers within organizations, to provide them with the basis to make informed business decisions that will allow them to be better equipped in their management and control functions.
 Tax accounting
 Tax accounting in the United States

History of accounting 

History of accounting – dates back to ancient Mesopotamia, and is closely related to developments in writing, counting and money, and early auditing systems by the ancient Egyptians and Babylonians.
 History of technologies leading to the development of accounting
 History of mathematics
 History of writing
 History of money
 History of double-entry bookkeeping systems

Key concepts 
 Accounting period –  period with reference to which accounting books of any entity are prepared.
 Accrual –  in finance, the adding together of interest or different investments over a period of time.
 Bookkeeping –  Bookkeeping is the recording of financial transactions.
 Cash and accrual basis –  The two primary accounting methods of the cash basis and the accruals basis (the difference being primarily one of timing) are used in three environments: in economics, to calculate US public debt, in financial reporting, as well in tax environment, in order to calculate taxable income for U.S. federal income taxes and other income taxes.
 Cash flow forecasting – key aspect of financial management of a business, planning its future cash requirements to avoid a crisis of liquidity.
 Chart of accounts – list of the accounts used by a business entity to define each class of items for which money or the equivalent is spent or received.
 Constant item purchasing power accounting –  consistent method of indexing accounts by means of a general index which reflects changes in the purchasing power of money. It therefore attempts to deal with the inflation problem in the sense in which this is popularly understood, as a decline in the value of the currency. It attempts to deal with this problem by converting all of the currency unit measurement in accounts into units at a common date by means of the index."
 Convergence –  goal of establishing a single set of accounting standards that will be used internationally, and in particular the effort to reduce the differences between the US Generally Accepted Accounting Principles , and the International Financial Reporting Standards .
 Cost of goods sold – inventory costs of those goods a business has sold during a particular period.
 Debits and credits – two aspects of every financial transaction.
 Double-entry system – set of rules for recording financial information in a financial accounting system in which every transaction or event changes at least two different nominal ledger accounts.
 FIFO and LIFO – accounting techniques used in managing inventory and financial matters involving the amount of money a company has tied up within inventory of produced goods, raw materials, parts, components, or feed stocks.
 GAAP / IFRS –  Generally Accepted Accounting Principles: standard framework of guidelines for financial accounting used in any given jurisdiction; generally known as accounting standards.
 Goodwill – accounting concept meaning the value of an entity over and above the value of its assets.
 Historical cost –  original monetary value of an economic item.
 Mark-to-market accounting – accounting for the fair value of an asset or liability based on the current market price of the asset or liability, or for similar assets and liabilities, or based on another objectively assessed "fair" value.
 Matching principle – ulmination of accrual accounting and the revenue recognition principle.
 Accounting records
 Ledgers
 General ledger – main accounting record of a business which uses double-entry bookkeeping.
 Journal –  where double entry bookkeeping entries are recorded by debiting one or more accounts and crediting another one or more accounts with the same total amount.
 Special journals – facilitate the process of journalizing and posting transactions.
 Bank statements
 Contracts and agreements
 Verification statements
 Transportation receipts
 Invoices
 Vouchers
 Revenue recognition – cornerstone of accrual accounting together with matching principle.
 Trial balance – list of all the General ledger accounts contained in the ledger of a business.

Financial statements 
 Balance sheet – summary of the financial balances of a sole proprietorship, a business partnership, a corporation or other business organization, such as an LLC or an LLP. Assets, liabilities and ownership equity are listed as of a specific date, such as the end of its financial year.
 Cash flow statement – financial statement that shows how changes in balance sheet accounts and income affect cash and cash equivalents, and breaks the analysis down to operating, investing, and financing activities.
 Income statement – financial statement that indicates how the revenue (money received from the sale of products and services before expenses are taken out, also known as the "top line") is transformed into the net income (the result after all revenues and expenses have been accounted for, also known as Net Profit or the "bottom line").
 Statement of changes in equity – financial statement that shows how the equity section of the statements have changed over the year.
 Notes – Notes to financial statements are additional information added to the end of financial statements.
 Management discussion and analysis – integrated part of a company's annual financial statements, and provides a narrative explanation, through the eyes of management, of how an entity has performed in the past, its financial condition, and its future prospects.
 XBRL – eXtensible Business Reporting Language: freely available, open, and global standard for exchanging business information.

Auditing 
 Auditor's report – The auditor's report is a formal opinion, or disclaimer thereof, issued by either an internal auditor or an independent external auditor as a result of an internal or external audit or evaluation performed on a legal entity or subdivision thereof .
 Control self-assessment – Control self-assessment is a technique developed in 1987 that is used by a wide range of organisations including corporations, charities and government departments, to assess the effectiveness of their risk management and control processes. In certain circumstances control self-assessment is not always effective. For example, it can be difficult to implement in a decentralised environment, in organisations where there is high employee turnover, where the organisation goes through frequent change or where the senior management of the organisation does not foster a culture of open communication.
 Financial audit – A financial audit, or more accurately, an audit of financial statements, is the verification of the financial statements of a legal entity, with a view to express an audit opinion.
 GAAS / ISA – Generally Accepted Auditing Standards, or GAAS are sets of standards against which the quality of audits are performed and may be judged.
 Internal audit – Internal auditing is an independent, objective assurance and consulting activity designed to add value and improve an organization's operations.
 Sarbanes–Oxley Act – The Sarbanes–Oxley Act of 2002 , also known as the 'Public Company Accounting Reform and Investor Protection Act'  and 'Corporate and Auditing Accountability and Responsibility Act'  and more commonly called Sarbanes–Oxley, Sarbox or SOX, is a United States federal law that set new or enhanced standards for all U.S.

Accounting software 
Accounting software
 Accounting information system
 Comparison of accounting software
 E-accounting
 Electronic billing
 Mortgage calculator
 Time-tracking software

Accounting qualifications 
 CIA – primary professional designation offered by The IIA.
 CA – first accountants to form a professional body, initially established in Britain in 1854.
 CPA – statutory title of qualified accountants in the United States who have passed the Uniform Certified Public Accountant Examination and have met additional state education and experience requirements for certification as a CPA.
 CCA – historically seen as a British qualified accountant designation awarded by the Association of Chartered Certified Accountants .
 CGA – designation of professionals who are jointly members of the Certified General Accountants Association of Canada and a provincial or territorial CGA association, or a CGA association overseas.
 CMA – used by various professional bodies around the world to designate their different professional certifications.
 CAT – offered by the Association of Chartered Certified Accountants .
 CIIA – global finance designation offered by the Association of Certified International Investment Analysts to financial professionals; candidates may be financial analysts, portfolio managers or investment advisors.
 IIA – guidance-setting body.
 CTP – certification awarded by the Association for Financial Professionals of Bethesda, Maryland to individuals who meet eligibility criteria and demonstrate current competency standards measured through the CTP examination.

Accounting organizations 
 List of accountancy bodies

Accounting publications

Journals 
 Abacus
 Accounting and the Public Interest
 Accounting Historians Journal
 Accounting History
 Accounting History Review
 Accounting Horizons
 Accounting Perspectives
 Accounting, Auditing & Accountability Journal
 Accounting, Organizations and Society
 Advances in Public Interest Accounting
 British Accounting Review
 Contemporary Accounting Research
 Critical Perspectives on Accounting
 European Accounting Review
 Journal of Accounting and Economics
 Journal of Accounting and Public Policy
 Journal of Accounting Research
 Journal of Accounting, Auditing & Finance
 Journal of Business Finance & Accounting
 Management Accounting Quarterly
 Research in Accounting Regulation
 Review of Accounting Studies
 Social and Environmental Accounting Journal
 The Accounting Review
 The Progressive Accountant

See also 

 Outline of business management
 Accountancy
 Accounting articles

References

External links 

 
 Operations Research in Accounting on the Institute for Operations Research and the Management Sciences website

 
Accounting
Accounting